Corupella asperata is a species of beetle in the family Cerambycidae, the only species in the genus Corupella.

References

Hesperophanini